Vityazevo is the name of several rural localities in Russia:
Vityazevo, Kostroma Oblast, a village in Sidorovskoye Settlement of Krasnoselsky District of Kostroma Oblast
Vityazevo, Krasnodar Krai, a selo in Vityazevsky Rural Okrug under the administrative jurisdiction of the Town of Anapa in Krasnodar Krai